Found Sound Nation is a New York-based music and education nonprofit organization.

It is made up of musicians and artists who use collaborative sound-making as a tool to help enhance communities and build bonds both locally and internationally. FSN was founded in 2007 by Chris Marianetti and Jeremy Thal. As a project of Bang on a Can, Found Sound Nation has organized numerous domestic and international workshops and performances.

Found Sound Nation has been involved in a number of projects all over the world, with two of its largest being the annual international music diplomacy programs: OneBeat, a partnership with The US Department of State's Bureau of Educational and Cultural Affairs. and The Dosti Music Project, a partnership with the Embassy of the United States, Islamabad

Selected projects

APV India (2009) 

Found Sound Nation's Chris Marianetti collaborated with students and teachers at Ashram Paryavarn Vidhyalaya School (APV) in the northern Indian Himalayan region of Uttarakhand to create soundscapes made from field and studio recordings.

Play Me I'm Yours (2010) 

Found Sound Nation remixed and documented Luke Jerram’s public art project, Play Me I’m Yours, which placed pianos in public spaces around New York City.

Horizons Juvenile Center (2011) 

In connection with Carnegie Hall’s Musical Connections Program, Found Sound Nation led empowering music production workshops at Horizons Juvenile Center.

OneBeat (2012–present) 

A collaboration with the United States Bureau of Education and Cultural Affairs, OneBeat brings together artists from around the world to the U.S. for a month-long residency and tour program.

Cine Institute (2012) 

Found Sound Nation helped Haitian film students record and produce original music for their films and assisted them in creating a sound library for future use.

Lucerne Studio (2013) 

Found Sound Nation set up a mobile ‘street studio’ to record and spontaneously compose music with musicians and passersby at the Lucerne Festival in Switzerland.

Dosti (2014–present) 

A collaboration with the United States Embassy in Pakistan, Dosti brings together eight musicians from Pakistan, India and the United States for a U.S. residency and tour.

FSN Presents (2014–present) 

An ongoing genre bending concert series highlighting emerging artists based at Redhook's Pioneer Works.

Big Ears Festival (2014, 2015) 

Found Sound Nation set up interactive Street Studios during Knoxville's annual Big Ears Festival.

Street Studio City (2015) 

Found Sound Nation partnered with producers from NYC to set up mobile “street studios” throughout the city. The producers engaged with passersby to spontaneously create improvised jam sessions that were later turned into full-length tracks and shared online.

References 

Music organizations based in the United States